Colm Browne was a Gaelic footballer and manager with Laois. He also managed the Tipperary senior football team.

Browne won numerous honours in the game including an All-Ireland Senior Club Football Championship with his club Portlaoise in 1983, a National Football League title with Laois in 1986 (and captaining that team) and an All Stars Award in 1986.

Browne is a member of the Garda Síochána at Templemore.

He was ratified as manager of the Laois senior team in 2000 and left in 2002.

References

 Comhairle Laighean 1900-2000 Tom Ryall, 2000
 Complete Handbook of Gaelic Games Raymond Smith, 1999
 Laois GAA Yearbook 1999 Leinster Express, 1999

Year of birth missing (living people)
Living people
Gaelic football managers
Garda Síochána officers
Laois inter-county Gaelic footballers
Portlaoise Gaelic footballers